Kateretes is a genus of short-winged flower beetles in the family Kateretidae. There are about six described species in Kateretes.

Species
These six species belong to the genus Kateretes:
 Kateretes dalmatinus (Sturm, 1844) g
 Kateretes flavicans (Fairmaire, 1860) g
 Kateretes mixtus Kirejtshuk, 1989 g
 Kateretes pusillus (Thunberg, 1794) g b
 Kateretes rufilabris (Latreille, 1807) g
 Kateretes scissus (Parsons, 1943) i c g
Data sources: i = ITIS, c = Catalogue of Life, g = GBIF, b = Bugguide.net

References

 
 

Nitidulidae